The Life and Opinions of Tristram Shandy, Gentleman, also known as Tristram Shandy, is a novel by Laurence Sterne, inspired by Don Quixote. It was published in nine volumes, the first two appearing in 1759, and seven others following over the next seven years (vols. 3 and 4, 1761; vols. 5 and 6, 1762; vols. 7 and 8, 1765; vol. 9, 1767). It purports to be a biography of the eponymous character. Its style is marked by digression, double entendre, and graphic devices. The first edition was printed by Ann Ward on Coney Street, York.

Sterne had read widely, which is reflected in Tristram Shandy. Many of his similes, for instance, are reminiscent of the works of the metaphysical poets of the 17th century, and the novel as a whole, with its focus on the problems of language, has constant regard for John Locke's theories in An Essay Concerning Human Understanding. Arthur Schopenhauer called Tristram Shandy one of "the four immortal romances".

While the use of the narrative technique of stream of consciousness is usually associated with modernist novelists, Tristram Shandy has been suggested as a precursor.

Synopsis and style

As its title suggests, the book is ostensibly Tristram's narration of his life story. But it is one of the central jokes of the novel that he cannot explain anything simply, that he must make explanatory diversions to add context and colour to his tale, to the extent that Tristram's own birth is not even reached until Volume III.

Consequently, apart from Tristram as narrator, the most familiar and important characters in the book are his father Walter, his mother, his Uncle Toby, Toby's servant Trim, and a supporting cast of popular minor characters, including the chambermaid Susannah, Doctor Slop and the parson Yorick, who later became Sterne's favourite nom de plume and a very successful publicity stunt. Yorick is also the protagonist of Sterne's second work of fiction, A Sentimental Journey Through France and Italy.

Most of the action is concerned with domestic upsets or misunderstandings, which find humour in the opposing temperaments of Walter—splenetic, rational, and somewhat sarcastic—and Uncle Toby, who is gentle, uncomplicated, and a lover of his fellow man.

In between such events, Tristram as narrator finds himself discoursing at length on sexual practices, insults, the influence of one's name and noses, as well as explorations of obstetrics, siege warfare and philosophy, as he struggles to marshal his material and finish the story of his life.

Though Tristram is always present as narrator and commentator, the book contains little of his life, only the story of a trip through France and accounts of the four comical mishaps which shaped the course of his life from an early age. Firstly, while he was still only an homunculus, Tristram's implantation within his mother's uterus was disturbed. At the very moment of procreation, his mother asked his father if he had remembered to wind the clock. The distraction and annoyance led to the disruption of the proper balance of humours necessary to conceive a well-favoured child. Secondly, one of his father's pet theories was that a large and attractive nose was important to a man making his way in life. In a difficult birth, Tristram's nose was crushed by Dr. Slop's forceps.

Thirdly, another of his father's theories was that a person's name exerted enormous influence over that person's nature and fortunes, with the worst possible name being Tristram. In view of the previous accidents, Tristram's father decreed that the boy would receive an especially auspicious name, Trismegistus. Susannah mangled the name in conveying it to the curate, and the child was christened Tristram. According to his father's theory, his name, being a conflation of "Trismegistus" (after the esoteric mystic Hermes Trismegistus) and "Tristan" (whose connotation bore the influence through folk etymology of Latin tristis, "sorrowful"), doomed him to a life of woe and cursed him with the inability to comprehend the causes of his misfortune.

Finally, as a toddler, Tristram suffered an accidental circumcision when Susannah let a window sash fall as he urinated out of the window because his chamberpot was missing.

Narrative structure and reader involvement 
Sterne's presence inside the narrative changed the course of traditional novelistic interpretations as his narrative structure digresses through many jumbled and fragmentary events into a non-traditional, dual overlapping plot. These digressive methods reflect his inability to simply explain each event as it occurs, as he frequently interrupts these events with commentary about how the reader should understand and follow each event.

He relies heavily on his reader's close involvement to the text and their interpretations of the non-traditional plot. Tristram's presence inside of the narrative as the narrator engages the imagination and his use of visual strategies, such as the marbled and blank pages, reflects the importance of the reader's participation in the novel.

Techniques and influences

Artistic incorporation and accusations of plagiarism
Sterne incorporated into Tristram Shandy many passages taken almost word for word from Robert Burton's The Anatomy of Melancholy, Francis Bacon's Of Death, Rabelais and many more, and rearranged them to serve the new meaning intended in Tristram Shandy. Tristram Shandy was highly praised for its originality, and nobody noticed these borrowings until years after Sterne's death. The first to note them was physician, poet and Portico Library Chair John Ferriar, who did not see them negatively and commented:

Ferriar believed that Sterne was ridiculing Burton's The Anatomy of Melancholy, mocking its solemn tone and endeavours to prove indisputable facts by weighty quotations.

Victorian critics of the 19th century, who were hostile to Sterne for the alleged obscenity of his prose, used Ferriar's findings to defame Sterne, and claimed that he was artistically dishonest, and almost unanimously accused him of mindless plagiarism. Scholar Graham Petrie closely analysed the alleged passages in 1970; he observed that while more recent commentators now agree that Sterne "rearranged what he took to make it more humorous, or more sentimental, or more rhythmical", none of them "seems to have wondered whether Sterne had any further, more purely artistic, purpose". Studying a passage in Volume V, chapter 3, Petrie observes: "such passage...reveals that Sterne's copying was far from purely mechanical, and that his rearrangements go far beyond what would be necessary for merely stylistic ends".

Rabelais
A major influence on Tristram Shandy is Rabelais' Gargantua and Pantagruel. Rabelais was by far Sterne's favourite author, and in his correspondence he made clear that he considered himself Rabelais's successor in humorous writing. One passage Sterne incorporated pertains to "the length and goodness of the nose". Sterne had written an earlier piece called A Rabelaisian Fragment that indicates his familiarity with the work of the French monk and doctor.

Ridiculing solemnity
Sterne was no friend of gravitas, a quality which excited his disgust. Tristram Shandy gives a ludicrous turn to solemn passages from respected authors that it incorporates, as well as to the consolatio literary genre.

Among the subjects of such ridicule were some of the opinions contained in Robert Burton's The Anatomy of Melancholy, a book that mentions sermons as the most respectable type of writing, and one that was favoured by the learned. Burton's attitude was to try to prove indisputable facts by weighty quotations. His book consists mostly of a collection of the opinions of a multitude of writers (he modestly refrains from adding his own) divided into quaint and old-fashioned categories. It discusses everything, from the doctrines of religion to military discipline, from inland navigation to the morality of dancing schools.

Much of the singularity of Tristram Shandys characters is drawn from Burton. Burton indulges himself in a Utopian sketch of a perfect government in his introductory address to the reader, and this forms the basis of the notions of Tristram Shandy on the subject. And Sterne parodies Burton's use of weighty quotations. The first four chapters of Tristram Shandy are founded on some passages in Burton.

In Chapter 3, Volume 5, Sterne parodies the genre of consolatio, mixing and reworking passages from three "widely separated sections" of Burton's Anatomy, including a parody of Burton's "grave and sober account" of Cicero's grief for the death of his daughter Tullia.

Other techniques and influences
His text is filled with allusions and references to the leading thinkers and writers of the 17th and 18th centuries. Alexander Pope and Jonathan Swift were major influences on Sterne and Tristram Shandy. Satires of Pope and Swift formed much of the humour of Tristram Shandy, but Swift's sermons and Locke's Essay Concerning Human Understanding also contributed ideas and frameworks  Sterne explored throughout the novel. Other major influences are Cervantes and Montaigne's Essays, as well as the significant inter-textual debt to The Anatomy of Melancholy, Swift's Battle of the Books, and the Scriblerian collaborative work The Memoirs of Martinus Scriblerus.

The shade of Cervantes is present throughout Sterne's novel. The frequent references to Rocinante, the character of Uncle Toby (who resembles Don Quixote in many ways) and Sterne's own description of his characters' "Cervantic humour", along with the genre-defying structure of Tristram Shandy, which owes much to the second part of Cervantes' novel, all demonstrate the influence of Cervantes.

The novel also makes use of John Locke's theories of empiricism, or the way we assemble what we know of ourselves and our world from the "association of ideas" that come to us from our five senses. Sterne is by turns respectful and satirical of Locke's theories, using the association of ideas to construct characters' "hobby-horses", or whimsical obsessions, that both order and disorder their lives in different ways. Sterne borrows from and argues against Locke's language theories (on the imprecision and arbitrariness of words and usage), and consequently spends much time discussing the very words he uses in his own narrative—with "digressions, gestures, piling up of apparent trivia in the effort to get at the truth".

There is a significant body of critical opinion that argues that Tristram Shandy is better understood as an example of an obsolescent literary tradition of "Learned Wit", partly following the contribution of D. W. Jefferson.

Reception and influence
Some of Sterne's contemporaries did not hold the novel in high esteem, but its bawdy humour was popular with London society. Through time, it has come to be seen as one of the greatest comic novels in English. Arthur Schopenhauer called Tristram Shandy one of "the four immortal romances."

Samuel Johnson in 1776 commented, "Nothing odd will do long. Tristram Shandy did not last." Schopenhauer privately rebutted Samuel Johnson, saying: "The man Sterne is worth 1,000 Pedants and commonplace-fellows like Dr. J." George Washington enjoyed the book.The young Karl Marx was a devotee of Tristram Shandy, and wrote a still-unpublished short humorous novel, Scorpion and Felix, that was obviously influenced by Sterne's work. Goethe praised Sterne in Wilhelm Meister's Journeyman Years, which in turn influenced Nietzsche.  Writing in The Times in January 2021, critic Michael Henderson disparaged the novel, stating that it "honks like John Coltrane, and is not nearly so funny."

Tristram Shandy has also been seen by formalists and other literary critics as a forerunner of many narrative devices and styles used by modernist and postmodernist authors such as James Joyce, Virginia Woolf, Carlos Fuentes, Milan Kundera and Salman Rushdie. Novelist Javier Marías cites Tristram Shandy as the book that changed his life when he translated it into Spanish at 25, claiming that from it he "learned almost everything about novel writing, and that a novel may contain anything and still be a novel."

The success of Sterne's novel got him an appointment by Lord Fauconberg as curate of St Michael's Church in Coxwold, Yorkshire, which included living at Sterne's model for Shandy Hall. The medieval structure still stands today, and is under the care of the Laurence Sterne Trust since its acquisition in the 1960s. The gardens, which Sterne tended during his time there, are daily open to visitors.

The novel's success has resulted in permanent additions to the English lexicon; within the text of Tristram Shandy Sterne describes the novel as "Shandean", coining a term which still carries the meaning that Sterne originally attached to it when he wrote, "I write a careless kind of a civil, nonsensical, good humoured Shandean book..." Strongly influenced by Cervantes' Don Quixote, Sterne's Tristram Shandy also gave rise to the term "cervantic" (which Sterne at the time spelled "cervantick").

Abolitionists
In 1766, at the height of the debate about slavery, Ignatius Sancho wrote a letter to Sterne encouraging the writer to use his pen to lobby for the abolition of the slave trade. "That subject, handled in your striking manner, would ease the yoke (perhaps) of many—but if only one—Gracious God!—what a feast to a benevolent heart!" he wrote.

In July 1766 Sancho's letter was received by Sterne shortly after he had just finished writing a conversation between his fictional characters Corporal Trim and his brother Tom in Tristram Shandy, in which Tom described the oppression of a black servant in a sausage shop in Lisbon, which he had visited. This "tender tale" was published in Chapter 65 (Vol. IV) of Tristram Shandy. Sterne's widely publicised 27 July 1766 response to Sancho's letter became an integral part of 18th-century abolitionist literature.

Adaptations

In 2005, BBC Radio 4 broadcast an adaptation by Graham White in ten 15-minute episodes directed by Mary Peate, with Neil Dudgeon as Tristram, Julia Ford as Mother, David Troughton as Father, Adrian Scarborough as Toby, Paul Ritter as Trim, Tony Rohr as Dr Slop, Stephen Hogan as Obadiah, Helen Longworth as Susannah, Ndidi Del Fatti as Great-Grandmother, Stuart McLoughlin as Great-Grandfather/Pontificating Man and Hugh Dickson as Bishop Hall.

Tristram Shandy has been adapted as a graphic novel by cartoonist Martin Rowson.
Michael Nyman has worked sporadically on Tristram Shandy as an opera since 1981. At least five portions of the opera have been publicly performed and one, "Nose-List Song", was recorded in 1985 on the album The Kiss and Other Movements.

The book was adapted on film in 2006 as A Cock and Bull Story, directed by Michael Winterbottom, written by Frank Cottrell Boyce (credited as Martin Hardy, in a complicated metafictional twist), and starring Steve Coogan, Rob Brydon, Keeley Hawes, Kelly Macdonald, Naomie Harris, and Gillian Anderson. The movie plays with metatextual levels, showing both scenes from the novel itself and fictionalised behind-the-scenes footage of the adaptation process, even employing some of the actors to play themselves.

In February 2014, a theatrical adaptation by Callum Hale was presented at the Tabard Theatre in Chiswick.

Tristram Shandy has been translated into many languages, including German (repeatedly, beginning in 1769), Dutch (repeatedly, by Munnikhuisen, 1779; Lindo, 1852 and Jan & Gertrude Starink, 1990), French (repeatedly, beginning in 1785; by Guy Jouvet, 2004), Russian (repeatedly, beginning 1804–1807; by Adrian Antonovich Frankovsky, 1949), Hungarian (by Győző Határ, 1956), Italian (by Antonio Meo, 1958), Czech (by Aloys Skoumal, 1963), Slovene (by Janez Gradišnik, 1968), Spanish (by José Antonio López de Letona, 1975; Ana María Aznar, 1976 and Javier Marías, 1978), Portuguese (by José Paulo Paes, 1984), Catalan (by Joaquim Mallafré, 1993), Norwegian (by Bjørn Herrman, 1995–96), Finnish (by Kersti Juva, 1998).

Tristram Shandy was adapted by Martin Pearlman in 2018 as a comic chamber opera, The Life and Opinions of Tristram Shandy.

References to Tristram Shandy
Well known in philosophy and mathematics, the so-called paradox of Tristram Shandy was introduced by Bertrand Russell in his book The Principles of Mathematics to evidentiate the inner contradictions that arise from the assumption that infinite sets can have the same cardinality—as would be the case with a gentleman who spends one year to write the story of one day of his life, if he were able to write for an infinite length of time. The paradox depends upon the fact that "the number of days in all time is no greater than the number of years". Karl Popper, in contrast, came to the conclusion that Tristram Shandy—by writing his history of life—would never be able to finish this story, because his last act of writing: that he is writing his history of life could never be included in his actual writing.

Heinrich Heine (1796–1856) mentioned the book in his writings. "The author of Tristram Shandy reveals to us the profoundest depths of the human soul; he opens, as it were, a crevice of the soul; permits us to take one glance into its abysses, into its paradise and into its filthiest recesses; then quickly lets the curtain fall over it. We have had a front view of that marvellous theatre, the soul; the arrangements of lights and the perspective have not failed in their effects, and while we imagined that we were gazing upon the infinite, our own hearts have been exalted with a sense of infinity and poetry."

At the start of his novel La Peau de chagrin, Honoré de Balzac includes an image from Tristram Shandy: a curvy line drawn in the air by a character seeking to express the freedom enjoyed "whilst a man is free". Balzac never explained his purpose behind the use of the symbol, and its significance to La Peau de chagrin is the subject of debate.

A historic site in Geneva, Ohio, called Shandy Hall, is part of the Western Reserve Historical Society. The home was named after the house described in Tristram Shandy.

The Perry Mason episode "The Case of the Bogus Books" involves a bookseller selling stolen copies of rare books, in particular a first edition of Tristram Shandy.

In Anthony Trollope's novel Barchester Towers, the narrator speculates that the scheming clergyman, Mr Slope, is descended from Dr Slop in Tristram Shandy (the extra letter having been added for the sake of appearances). Slope is also called "Obadiah", a reference to another character in Sterne's novel.

Russian writer Alexander Zhitinsky made multiple references to Tristram Shandy in his novel The Flying House, or Conversations with Milord (the "milord" of the title being Sterne).

In Surprised by Joy, C. S. Lewis refers to Tristram Shandy in the context of trying to describe his interactions with his own father:

(The text of Tristram Shandy uses the phrase "my father" at the head of a paragraph fifty-one times.)

Christopher Morley, editor of The Saturday Review of Literature, wrote a preface to the Limited Editions Club issue of Sterne's classic. That preface appears in Morley's book Streamlines published by Doubleday, Doran, in 1932, and is titled "Tristram Shandy".

In the Hermann Hesse novel Journey to the East, Tristram Shandy is listed as one of the co-founders of The League.

A short story, Oh Most Cursed Addition Engine, by H. S. Donnelly, was published in the Canadian science fiction magazine On Spec #86. In it, Walter Shandy attempts to build an addition engine, while Toby and Corporal Trim re-enact in miniature Wellington's great victory at Vitoria.

Trim was the adventurous ship's cat of the explorer Matthew Flinders, named after Corporal Trim, and a minor (yet titular) character in Bryce Courtenay's novel Matthew Flinders' Cat.

In the 1976 film The Missouri Breaks, with Marlon Brando and Jack Nicholson, Braxton, a rancher, has just hanged an alleged cattle rustler without a trial and is defending himself to his daughter who vehemently disapproves of the hanging. Finishing his justification he prepares to relax in his library and asks his daughter to fetch him his copy of Tristram Shandy.

In the 2019 film The Professor and the Madman, Muncie gives Dr. Minor a gift for saving another guard's life. It is a book and is later revealed by Dr. Minor to be Tristram Shandy.

See also 
 Hafen Slawkenbergius, a fictional character in Tristram Shandy
 Ann Ward, editor of the York Courant who printed Tristram Shandy in her printing house on Coney Street in York.

References

Citations

Bibliography 
 Ferriar, John (1798) Illustrations of Sterne
 
 Petrie, Graham (1970). "A Rhetorical Topic in Tristram Shandy", Modern Language Review, Vol. 65, No. 2, April 1970, pp. 261–66. .

Further reading 

 
 
 
 
 
 
   Collects Brady and Jefferson's essays.

External links 

 Editions
 The Laurence Sterne Trust collection – A collection of editions of Sterne's works housed in Shandy Hall, Coxwold, York.
 The Life and Opinions of Tristram Shandy, Gentleman at Internet Archive and Google Books (scanned books original editions colour illustrated)
 
  (plain text, HTML and other)
 

 Miscellaneous
 The Shandeanscholarly journal for the critical and historical investigation of all aspects of the work and life of Sterne
 Illustrated book exhibitionGlasgow University Library Special Collections Department
 An annotated bibliography, by Jack Lynch

1759 novels
Novels by Laurence Sterne
18th-century British novels
British satirical novels
Novels involved in plagiarism controversies
Self-reflexive novels
Metafictional novels
Postmodern novels
Picaresque novels
Irish novels adapted into films
Novels adapted into radio programs
Nonlinear narrative novels
Novels adapted into operas
Irish novels adapted into plays
Novels adapted into comics